HGV may refer to:
 Heavy goods vehicle
 Hypersonic glide vehicle
 Hepatitis G virus, or GB virus C
 HGV Video Productions, a former Canadian home video distributor
 Histology Group of Victoria, an Australian discussion group